The Devlins were an alternative rock band originating from Dublin, Republic of Ireland, although the eponymous Devlin brothers were born in Newry, County Down.

History 
The Devlins have released four albums to date. Their first album, Drift, received a four-star review in Rolling Stone. After several years where Colin Devlin developed a solo career, the Devlins did shows in Ireland in 2011 and released a new single, promising a new album in 2012; however, this album was never released. Colin Devlin has continued actively working as a solo musician.

Soundtrack inclusions 
"Waiting" was featured in remix form on the 2002 Six Feet Under soundtrack, but originally from their 1997 release Waiting; and "World Outside", was included in the 2004 drama Closer.

Their song "Crossing The River" is featured in the soundtrack of Batman Forever. Their Song "Montreal" was featured in one episode of Discovery Channel's Road Trip USA.

Discography

The Devlins
 Drift (1993), single "I Knew That" 1994 video directed by Paul Boyd
 Waiting (1997)
 Consent (2002)
 Waves (2004)

Colin Devlin
Albums
 Democracy Of One (2009)
 The Killing Joke (instrumental soundtrack) (2013)
 High Point (2018)

Singles
 "Let The Great World Spin" (non-album single) (2012)
 "On New Year’s Day" (non-album single) (2015)
 "Time Rolls By" (track from the motion picture soundtrack, Jenny’s Wedding) (2015)
 "Love Is Blindness" (non-album single, a cover of the band U2’s song from Achtung Baby. The song features Randy Young, from the band Poco) (2021)

References

External links 
 Official Colin Devlin website

Irish indie rock groups
Musical groups established in 1993
Musical groups from Dublin (city)
1993 establishments in Ireland